Parnopes is a genus of cuckoo wasps in the family Chrysididae, the sole genus of the tribe Parnopini. There are about seven described species in Parnopes.

Species
These seven species belong to the genus Parnopes:
 Parnopes chrysoprasinus b
 Parnopes denticulatus Spinola, 1838 g
 Parnopes edwardsii b
 Parnopes fischeri Spinola, 1838 g
 Parnopes fulvicornis b
 Parnopes incuratus Panfilov, 1969 g
 Parnopes popovi Eversmann, 1857 g
Data sources: i = ITIS, c = Catalogue of Life, g = GBIF, b = Bugguide.net

References

Further reading

External links

 

Chrysidinae